Carmona  is a genus of flowering plants in the borage family, Boraginaceae. Members of the genus are commonly known as scorpionbush.

Carmona retusa (Fukien tea tree) is used in bonsai because of its ability to develop a thick and interesting trunk, small white flowers that bloom almost year-round, and tiny round green, red, or black fruits. The lobed leaves are shiny dark green and maintain their small size.

Cultivation and care

Cultivation
The Carmona plant is popularly cultivated as a bonsai tree indoors. It is a fast-growing indoor plant that displays lush foliage of glossy, textured leaves around a smooth, attractive-looking bark.

The plant blooms with snowy blossoms throughout the growing season, making it a popular aesthetic plant to buy for indoor spaces. In fact, these flowers eventually transform into red-colored berries, which makes cultivating the Carmona species as a bonsai plant a rewarding experience.

Care
Due to the enjoyable aspect of cultivating and maintaining the Carmona bonsai plant, it is easy to find numerous pre-trained and pre-potted Carmona bonsai plants online. However, the cultivation of the Carmona plant does not end here. it is important to check for all plant features, age and health before buying. This is because all of these plant attributes combined together define the amount of care the plant will need indoors.

Placement
Carmona bonsai plants are easy to grow and maintain indoors. In fact, the plant thrives at the average room of temperature of 20 degrees C (70 degrees Fahrenheit), which is easy to achieve inside closed walls.

Proper placement requires the plant be kept near a window. This allows the plant to receive bright sunlight for sufficient amount of time daily.

It is important to protect the plant from cold or frosty winds coming in through any open windows during the winter season. This is because the plant prefers warmth and sunlight to thrive best. Nevertheless, artificial heat sources such as room heaters should be avoided in the plant vicinity, as these can make the air dry for this moisture-loving plant.

Watering
Most experts recommend watering the Carmona plant is 2 to 3 times per week. As long as this frequency is maintained, any Carmona bonsai tree will flourish well and with ease.

The basic rule of thumb is to water your Carmona bonsai plant every time the soil runs dry. This will ensure regular watering of the plant while avoiding the risk of causing root rot by overwatering.

Fertilization
Solid organic fertilizer is most suitable for the Carmona bonsai plant. This is because the plant has sensitive roots than be damaged by artificial or liquid fertilizer.

Feeding with fertilizer should be done once a month, to get the best growth and bloom of Carmona flowers. This is especially important during the growing season, which is from spring to fall and before the plant blooms. For best results and growth, a phosphorus-rich fertilizer is recommended during spring, and switching to a potassium-rich fertilizer in fall.

Pruning
When cultivating the Carmona bonsai plant indoors, it is easy to shape it in any desired manner by pruning the leaves and branches. This can be performed any time of the year, as the plant withstands pruning well throughout the year.

Leaving behind 2 to 3 leaves on every pruned shoot is recommended while pruning the Carmona bonsai plant. This ensures that the branches grow back in a healthy way.

Repotting
The plant needs to be re-potted into a new pot after every 2 years. Doing so gives the roots the desired space and nutrients they need in a new pot with fresh soil mix.

Re-potting of the Carmona bonsai should preferably be done in the spring or growing season. This is when the roots and plant can grow back well and in time. Moreover, using well-drained soil is recommended, and care while trimming the roots as they are of sensitive nature.

Pests and diseases
The Carmona plant becomes susceptible to pests and insects under inadequate conditions. Therefore, proper sunlight and watering will ensure the Carmona plant stays pest-free.

In case of any infection appearing, it is best to use pesticide sprays or insect sticks to get rid of the infestation. With bright sun and regular watering followed pest treatment, the plant will restore back to good health easily.

References

 Species 2000
 Types of Bonsai Trees

External links

Ehretioideae
Ornamental trees
Plants used in bonsai
Boraginaceae genera